The HispanicBusiness 500 was a directory published by HispanTelligence of the 500 largest Hispanic-owned business in the United States. The list was published for 31 years, ending at 2013. To be included in the list, a company must have had at least 51 percent ownership by a U.S. Hispanic citizen. The last edition of the list, published in 2013, was dominated by Florida companies, headed by Brightstar Corporation.

See also
Fortune 500
Forbes 500

References

Lists of companies of the United States